Amhat Airstrip is an airstrip in Amhat near Sultanpur city in the Indian state of Uttar Pradesh. It had an aviation academy named Saraswati Aviation Academy, a private flight training school co-located with the airfield. After the COVID-19 pandemic in India, this Aviation Academy didn't renew its recognition which was ended on 30 July 2020.

Airlines and destinations 
The airport/airstrip has only unscheduled chartered flights.

References

Airports in Uttar Pradesh
Sultanpur, Uttar Pradesh